Stenoma exarata is a moth in the family Depressariidae. It was described by Philipp Christoph Zeller in 1854. It is found in Costa Rica, Mexico, Guatemala, Venezuela, French Guiana and Brazil (Amazonas).

References

Moths described in 1854
Stenoma